Xenia (Ξενία) was a nationwide hotel construction program initiated by the Hellenic Tourism Organisation (Ελληνικός Οργανισμός Τουρισμού, E.O.T.) to improve the country's tourism infrastructure in the 1960s and 1970s. It constitutes one of the largest infrastructure projects in modern Greek history.

History
Until the 1950s, Greece featured only a few major hotels, mostly situated in the country's great cities, and a few smaller ones in islands like Corfu or Rhodes. In 1950, EOT began a program to construct and operate hotels across the country, especially in the less-travelled areas. Locations were specially selected and the architecture combined local knowledge with standardized elements. The buildings were embedded in the landscape, but at the same time followed a modernist style.

The first manager of the project was the architect Charalambos Sfaellos (from 1950 to 1958) and from 1957 the buildings were designed by a team under Aris Konstantinidis. Many private hotel projects in Greece were inspired by the Xenia hotels and the program had reached its aims in the early 1970s. In 1974 the construction program was complete. The Xenia program itself was officially terminated in 1983, and the hotels were given over to private operators or eventually sold off.

Some hotels are still operated privately under the Xenia name. Many of the program's hotels have been designated as historic monuments for their architectural value. Three have been demolished, while other surviving examples have been substantially altered or are in a dilapidated state.

Bibliography
Donat, John: "Architecture of the Xenia Hotels" in World architecture, Volume 3, 1966. Page 145ff

External links
A still functioning XENIA Hotel at Hora Sfakion
Article of the Eleftherotypia about the program (Greek) 
Pictures of the abandoned hotel in Andros, (1958/ today)
Pictures of the abandoned hotel in Paliouri, Chalidiki (1962/ today)

Hotels in Greece
Greek brands